The Vöckla is a river in Upper Austria.

The Vöckla originates northeast of the Mondsee. Created by several springs, the river flows in northern direction first. At Frankenmarkt the direction changes to the East, where it passes through Vöcklamarkt, Timelkam, where it is joined by the Dürre Ager, and finally Vöcklabruck, where it discharges into the Ager.

References

External links

Rivers of Upper Austria
Rivers of Austria